Jobseeker's Allowance (JSA) is an  unemployment benefit paid by the Government of the United Kingdom to people who are unemployed and actively seeking work. It is part of the social security benefits system and is intended to cover living expenses while the claimant is out of work.

JSA is administered by the Department for Work and Pensions (DWP) in England, Wales, and Scotland, and in Northern Ireland by the Department for Communities. Claimants must be between 18 years of age and the State Pension age.

There is now one form of Jobseeker's Allowance: contribution-based JSA (and also previously, income-based JSA, which had replaced Income Support for most customers in 1996). Universal Credit was due to replace Jobseeker's Allowance and other benefits for 500,000 new claimants from October 2013, and eventually will replace income-based Jobseeker's Allowance entirely.

To be eligible for JSA, claimants must state that they are actively seeking work by filling in a Jobseeker's Agreement form and attending a New Jobseeker interview (NJI). They must also go to a Jobcentre Plus every two weeks to "sign on", that is, to certify that they are still actively seeking work. Until 2020, claims for Jobseeker's Allowance were maintained by the legacy Jobseeker's Allowance Payment System (JSAPS).

Legislation

Earlier history

Unemployment Benefit was first introduced in 1911 under the National Insurance Act 1911 to job seekers who had paid National Insurance contributions ("the stamp").  The maximum amount payable was seven shillings a week. These payments were thus made only to people who had recently been in work, and not simply to those on low incomes. Furthermore, benefits were only paid for up to twelve months, by which time a claimant had to have regained work.

The Unemployment Insurance Act of March 1921 introduced a 'seeking work' test which required claimants to be actively seeking work and willing to accept employment paying a fair wage. In February 1922 a means test was introduced which excluded some, such as single adults who lived with relatives, from receiving benefit payments.

As a direct consequence of the return from war of injured servicemen, the Disabled Persons (Employment) Act 1944 was brought into force to enable these to secure employment.

After the Second World War, National Assistance was introduced by the National Assistance Act 1948, allowing anyone of working age on a low income to apply for support.

National Assistance was replaced by Supplementary Benefit in November 1966, and Unemployment Benefit claimants could transfer to this after their initial entitlement had expired. Supplementary Benefit was later replaced by Income Support in April 1988.

Legislation

During 1995 legislation was passed through the House of Commons entitled the Jobseekers Act 1995. The Jobseeker's Allowance Regulations 1996  were produced within a period of six months from the act coming into force, with the change of Income Support provision to Jobseekers Allowance occurring on 7 October 1996. Previously, on 11 September 1996, the Social Security (Credits and Contributions) (Jobseeker's Allowance Consequential and Miscellaneous Amendments) Regulations  were created, brought before parliament five days later and subsequently made policy coming into force also on 7 October.

The change was introduced to streamline the systematic administration of benefits by improving claimant compliance and to partially remove the distinction between means-tested claimants and those claiming against contribution records.

Subsequent legislation

in April 2011 Iain Duncan Smith introduced a period of mandatory work activity amounting to a maximum of four weeks of thirty hours each week in employment.  It was expected this activity would  be required of approximately 10,000 individuals.  The main claimants who it was expected would be subject to mandatory work activity were those who had been signing-on for at least thirteen weeks. Despite this any recipient of Jobseeker-benefit could be required to take part in work activity regardless of how long that person had been signing on.

At some time the Social Security Advisory Committee felt a need for an initiative so The Employment Skills and Regulations Scheme was considered. The governmental bodies had a look at the ideas and felt they weren't altogether correct.  So the government only accepted the need for two-thirds of the total of changes suggested. During 2011 the Jobseeker's Allowance (Employment, Skills and Enterprise) Regulations were brought into force.  One part of the scheme required the long-term unemployed to participate in unpaid work activity for a maximum of six-months.

Statistics
Roughly 2% of welfare expenditure in the UK is spent on Jobseeker's Allowance; the bulk is spent in other areas.

The average number of claimants between the years 2003 and 2008 was 814,000 and average number of new claims was approximately 2,463,000. Nearly 40% of income-based claimants during 2003, were also claiming Housing Benefit. The DWP for England and Wales showed one third of the total number of claimants for JSA were persons having been convicted of a crime resulting in their act(s) having been recorded by the police authorities. In the Guardian newspaper in March 2001, the success of the New Deal scheme was reported, the report stated that 270,000 people were found full-time employment and the cost of achieving this end was half of the estimated amount. According to a report in 2008 by the Social Market Foundation there were approximately 100,000 long-term unemployed persons claiming JSA, at any given time. From 2010 to April 2011 the number of claimants having sanctions  imposed increased to 75,000 persons amid claims that DWP staff deliberately made claiming more difficult and were required to refer 3 people a week for sanctions. The number of disabled people sanctioned doubled to 20,000 over the same period. The Department for Work and Pensions denied persecuting vulnerable people.

Application methods
According to the UK government webpage on how to apply, application can be made online or by phone. Application can also be made on paper forms; JSA1, or JSA4RR if reclaiming JSA.

Claimant Commitment
When claimants attend their first Jobseeker Interview, they are required to sign a contract with their advisor, this is called a claimant commitment.  The contract can be changed at one-to-one interviews. Its terms include that claimants state:
 what activities they will perform to look for work
 The maximum commuting time they will accept
 The type of work they are ideally looking for (although claimants should be prepared to accept anything within their capabilities)
 How many times they will search suitable jobsearch websites each week
 Whether they will use any magazines/newspapers to find jobs
 The maximum hours they are able to work, taking into consideration barriers such as health, child care etc.

Whether claimants are paid therefore depends on whether they uphold the contract they have agreed to – from a political theory known as Welfare Contractualism, first expressed in the 1998 paper New Ambitions for our Country: A New Contract for Welfare

Eligibility
All applicants qualify by conforming to all of the following requirements:
 being 18 or over but below State Pension age - there are some exceptions if you’re 16 or 17.
 not being in full-time education.
 living in England, Scotland or Wales.
 being available for work.
 actively seeking work.
 working on average less than 16 hours per week.
 attending a JSA interview after they apply.

Contribution-based
New-style (contribution-based) Jobseeker's Allowance (JSA(C)) entitlement is based on Class 1 National Insurance contributions in the two complete tax years preceding the benefit year of claim. This allowance is paid regardless of assets; however, any personal or occupational pension over £50 a week result in deductions. There are also other caveats (related to job-seeking activity) which exclude payment.  

Many older citizens seeking work cannot receive payments, despite qualifying through NI contributions, because they have pension income. Self-employed people do not pay Class 1 contributions, and may not be able to claim JSA(C) until their case has been decided. However, they are both still eligible for NI credits (see below).

JSA(C) may be claimed for only 26 weeks in any benefit year. In order to make a claim, a customer must have actually paid NI contributions for the same number of weeks in one of the last two tax years (the remaining 18 months can be either paid, or credited contributions). When entitlement to JSA(C) is exhausted, Universal Credit may then become payable if eligible (see below).

Certain other benefits including Statutory Sick Pay, Statutory Paternity Pay, Statutory Maternity Pay, statutory adoption pay, Employment and Support Allowance, bereavement benefit, Carer's Allowance and JSA(C) itself also count towards Class 1 contributions and are called "Credited Class 1 contributions". 

If there is no entitlement to Universal Credit, a person can re-qualify for JSA(C) in a subsequent benefit year based on contributions paid in the relevant contribution years, providing that there has been a break in of at least twelve weeks. They must wait until the beginning of a new benefit year before they can claim again.

Income-based
People who are eligible for JSA(C) could also claim JSA(IB) for any additional payments due under that benefit (for family dependents, for example). JSA(IB) was payable only if the claimant has less than £16,000 in capital (correct as of May 2022). Payments are reduced if the claimant has savings between £6,000 and £16,000.

Both forms of benefit face 100% marginal deductions if the individual earns more than a small amount – the 'disregard' – this is £5 per week for single people, £10 per week for couples and £20 per week for certain other groups such as some lone parents and disabled people. The 'disregard' has remained at the same nominal amount since the 1980s and has never been uprated with inflation, unlike benefits themselves. The benefit is withdrawn from those working 16 or more hours a week (though this does not apply to voluntary work). Part-time students can claim provided they do not have more than 16 hours a week in teacher contact time and the course is not officially designated as full-time by the college (irrespective of the number of hours of contact time).

Work programmes

New Deal

Starting in 2001, the New Deal introduced a second stage to the claim period. Initially, there is the jobseekers agreement and allowance. If a claimant who is below the female state pension is unemployed for over twelve months, they are placed on the New Deal scheme. They may also enter the New Deal process early if they fall in special categories. From 2009, a Flexible New Deal scheme started using the private sector to provide tailored employment and skills support, with return-to-work performance incentives for the providers.

In Northern Ireland the New Deal was replaced in 2008 by a similar scheme known as Steps to Work. This scheme is administered by the Department for Employment and Learning which operates Jobs & Benefits Offices jointly with the Social Security Agency.
During October 2009 the New Deal programmes were replaced by the Flexible New Deal programmes, these available to claimants still unemployed after a period of twelve months.

The Work Programme

Work programmes ; Flexible New deal, New Deal for Young People, New Deal 25+, New Deal for Disabled people, New Deal for Lone parents, Pathways to Work, Progress2Work and Employment Zones, were replaced by The Work programme during June 2011. On 6 March 2012 the UK Government announced benefits changes for prisoners at the end of their sentence and those claiming JSA. They would be sent on the work programme, as would JSA claimants who had been claiming for the previous 26 weeks. On the work programme they must sign a form to agree to a 30 hours a week of unpaid work or face sanctions of 6 months. Unlike New Deal there is no choice of training or help setting up a business neither can the job seeker choose what type of unpaid work they do. In nearly all cases the unpaid placement involves shop work. From 2012, work placement advisors would receive £5,600 should they find work for a person leaving prison who keeps the job for two years. According to the Government, from June 2011 only 1 in 5 participants in the Work Programme remained off benefits for over six months.

Pensioners
Until 2020, men who reached the women's State Pension age had two options. They could still claim Jobseeker's Allowance, but had to remain actively seeking work. They would continue to receive the contribution-based rate of JSA if they were claiming it.

Alternatively, a man on a low income could apply for Pension Credit on reaching the women's state pension age. This replaced Jobseeker's Allowance payments and he would no longer need to "sign on" at the JobCentre. In both cases, the amount of benefit paid was the same (an additional Pensioner Premium was added to Income-based JSA). 

National Insurance credits were paid by the Government on his behalf, even if he claimed another benefit; this came to an end in 2016, with the new State Pension.

Women could only claim until they reached the State Pension age; this increased gradually between 2010 and 2020. The State Pension age is now 66 for both men and women, as of 2020.

All customers must move from JSA to either State Pension, or Pension Credit (if eligible) at the State Pension age. A special part-week payment of State Pension is paid for the benefit week including the customer's birthday, making the claim continuous.

Sanctioning
A claimant's Jobseeker's Allowance may be stopped as a punishment. A person choosing to remain out of employment should a vacancy be available is obliged to give a "good reason" for the choice or their monies are to be withheld. A committee of MP's found the benefit sanctions system is pointlessly cruel.  The Work and Pensions Committee discovered single parents, care leavers and claimants with health problems and disabilities were "disproportionately vulnerable" to, and impacted by, sanctions.  There was an excessive human cost.  Children could become "collateral damage" since parents losing benefits affects them.  Examples of "extreme hardship and distress" included a wheelchair user who, "sofa-surfed" or slept in a college library for a year when her whole benefit was wrongly withdrawn.  A man was sanctioned because he missed a job centre appointment three days after he went to hospital with severe epileptic seizures.  The committee found the impact of sanctions had not been properly evaluated.

Other reasons to be denied money are
 Not being available for or actively seeking work or not signing the Jobseeker's Agreement: if a claimant does not declare on the Jobseeker's Agreement that they are available for and actively seeking work and sign the Agreement, the benefit will be suspended until the claimant completes and signs the agreement. Once the agreement has been signed, a Decision Maker will decide how much of the claim should be backdated, if any.
 Failing to attend a Jobcentre appointment: the claimant may be fined 4 or 13 weeks' income.
 Voluntarily leaving work or refusing a notified vacancy. The claimant may be sanctioned for up to 13 weeks' or 26 weeks' income in the case of repeated transgressions.
 Refusing to attend compulsory scheme or failing to comply with Direction. A punishment of 4 weeks' loss of income for the first instance and 13 weeks' for second and subsequent instances.
 you don’t accept or keep to your Claimant Commitment.
 you don’t go to a Jobcentre Plus when asked.
 you turn down a job or training course.
 you don’t apply for any jobs you’re told about.
 you don’t take part in any interviews you’re invited to.
 you don’t go to any training booked for you or take part in employment schemes.
 By leaving your last job or training without good reason or because of your behaviour.
Payment will be stopped for between 4 weeks and 26 weeks.
Sanctions have been found to be ineffective in getting claimants into work but do great harm to the claimants, especially to disabled claimants who are disproportionately targeted with sanctions.

Criticism of sanctions
The charity Oxfam opposed what they consider unfair sanctions

The Guardian has listed ten cases of stopped benefits which it regards as either for “trivial reasons” or due to DWP “administrative errors.”   The former included three people who were in hospital due to their own sickness or attending a sick partner and a person who went for a job interview instead of attending the job centre.  The latter included letters sent by the DWP to the wrong address and people who arrived on time at the job centre but found an unusually long queue. The Independent cites a man who had a heart attack during a work capability assessment and was sanctioned for not completing it.  Two cases show reasonably foreseeable consequences for sanctioned diabetic claimants, one resorted to begging for food   whilst another who was apparently unable to afford to keep his insulin properly refrigerated was found dead, leading to a parliamentary select committee investigation of sanctions.
In the last quarter of 2013 there were 227,629 claimants sanctioned, a rise of 69,600 compared to the equivalent time in 2012.  Over a million British claimants were sanctioned between October 2012 and December 2013. 633,000 got their benefits back after referral and 580,273 referrals were cancelled.  Even when benefits are restored on appeal the stress sanctions cause can worsen mental health.

Paul Jenkins, chief executive of the Tavistock and Portman NHS Foundation Trust, who previously worked for Rethink Mental Illness, criticised the reintroduction of sanctions, which were suspended in March 2020 because of the COVID-19 pandemic in the United Kingdom.  He said benefit sanctions policy was “really cruel and ineffective”.

Alleged pressure on Job centre staff
According to Patrick Wintour in the Guardian, job centre staff were threatened they would be disciplined and given targets because it was felt too few claimants were sanctioned.  Statistics are kept about the proportion of claimants sanctioned at each job centre and those with relatively low proportions of claimants sanctioned can face questions.  There has been a 'climate of fear' at job centres with staff under pressure to sanction innocent people to meet targets. Also sanctions harm the children of sanctioned claimants.  Sanctioned claimants and their families sometimes need food banks to get something to eat. The government was urged to review the effects of sanctions in particular on claimants with  psychiatric problems and disabilities.  People with Learning disability frequently have trouble understanding what is required of them.  James Bolton of Mencap said,

See also
 Unemployment benefits
 Welfare (financial aid)
 Workfare

References

External links
 Jobseeker's Allowance on Gov.uk

Unemployment in the United Kingdom
Social security in the United Kingdom